Júlio César Jacobi (born 2 September 1986), known as Júlio César, is a Brazilian professional footballer who plays as a goalkeeper for Grêmio Foot-Ball Porto Alegrense.

Club career
Born in Guaramirim, Santa Catarina, Júlio César started his professional career at Botafogo de Futebol e Regatas, signing a five-year contract in August 2005. He made his Série A debut in a 0–0 home draw against Sport Club Corinthians Paulista, on 26 November 2006.

In January 2008, Júlio César moved to Portugal, joining C.F. Os Belenenses. He first played in the Primeira Liga on 23 February against C.S. Marítimo, replacing striker Weldon in the 29th minute after goalkeeper Paulo Costinha had been sent off, in an eventual 1–3 home loss.

After having played all the matches and minutes in his first full season – Belenenses was relegated, but later reinstated – he signed with Lisbon neighbours S.L. Benfica, thus reuniting with former manager Jorge Jesus. In his first year he backed up Quim, demoting José Moreira to third-choice and starting in the club's campaign in the UEFA Europa League.

On 8 April 2010, in the dying minutes of Benfica's 1–4 loss at Liverpool for the Europa League quarter-finals (and subsequent 3–5 aggregate exit), Júlio César suffered a concussion after colliding with Dirk Kuyt, having to be hospitalized. He fully recovered, appearing in a total of 14 official matches during the campaign.

On 17 August 2011, Júlio César moved to Granada CF in La Liga in a season-long move, alongside teammates Carlos Martins and Jorge Ribeiro. He made his debut for the Andalusians on 13 December in a 1–4 away defeat to Real Sociedad for the Copa del Rey, and played mostly understudy to Roberto during his spell.

On 1 September 2013, after one year limited to training, Júlio César terminated his contract with Benfica. On 10 March of the following year, after more than one year out of football, he agreed to a five-month contract with Getafe CF as an emergency signing after Miguel Ángel Moyá's serious injury.

Júlio César was signed by Fluminense FC on 9 September 2014, returning to his homeland after six years.

Career statistics

Honours

Club
Botafogo
Campeonato Carioca: 2006
Taça Rio: 2007, 2008

Benfica
Taça da Liga: 2009–10
Supertaça Cândido de Oliveira: Runner-up 2010

Individual
Campeonato Carioca: Team of the Year 2018

References

External links
 
 
 
 
 

1986 births
Living people
Sportspeople from Santa Catarina (state)
Brazilian footballers
Association football goalkeepers
Campeonato Brasileiro Série A players
J. Malucelli Futebol players
Botafogo de Futebol e Regatas players
Fluminense FC players
Grêmio Foot-Ball Porto Alegrense players
Primeira Liga players
C.F. Os Belenenses players
S.L. Benfica footballers
La Liga players
Granada CF footballers
Getafe CF footballers
Brazilian expatriate footballers
Expatriate footballers in Portugal
Expatriate footballers in Spain
Brazilian expatriate sportspeople in Portugal
Brazilian expatriate sportspeople in Spain